Upper Goulburn was an electoral district of the Legislative Assembly in the Australian state of Victoria, from 1904 to 1945. It was based in northern Victoria. Upper Goulburn was created in 1904 after the abolition of the Electoral district of Delatite and the Electoral district of Anglesey. Thomas Hunt was the last member for Anglesey (1903 to 1904) and first for Upper Goulburn.

The area of the district of Upper Goulburn was defined in the Victorian Electoral Districts Boundaries Act 1903, taking effect at the 1904 election.

Members for Upper Goulburn

Election results

References

Former electoral districts of Victoria (Australia)
1904 establishments in Australia
1945 disestablishments in Australia